Saudi Arabia competed at the 2009 World Championships in Athletics in Berlin from 15–23 August 2009.

Team selection

Track and road events

Field and combined events

Results
Track and road events

Field and combined events

References

External links
Official competition website

Nations at the 2009 World Championships in Athletics
World Championships in Athletics
Saudi Arabia at the World Championships in Athletics